Anna Höglund (born May 14, 1958) is a Swedish writer and illustrator, considered to be one of Sweden's best illustrators.

Life and career 
She was born in Stockholm and has no formal art training. Her first book was Sagan om Pannkakan ("The pancake story"), published in 1982. She has also written plays and made animated films. Sagan om Pannkakan was made into an animated film in 1992.

Her work is included in the collections of the Gothenburg Museum of Art and the Nationalmuseum in Stockholm.

Selected works 
 Kan du vissla Johanna? (in English Can You Whistle, Johanna? from Gecko Press) text by Ulf Stark (1992)
 Resor jag aldrig har gjort ("Journeys I have never made") (1992)
 Mina och Kåge (1995)
 Min syster är en ängel ("My Sister is an Angel") text by Ulf Stark (1996)
 Om detta talar man endast med kaniner ("This is something that you only talk about with rabbits") (2013)
Förvandlingen (in English The Stone Giant from Gecko Press) (2018)

Awards 
 Zilveren Penseel award for Kan du vissla Johanna? in 1994
 Deutscher Jugendliteraturpreis for Kan du vissla Johanna? in 1995
 Deutscher Jugendliteraturpreis for Resor jag aldrig har gjort in 1996
 August Prize for Min syster är en ängel in 1996
 Pier Paolo Vergerio European Prize for children's literature for Mina och Kåge in 1998
 Nils Holgersson Plaque for Om detta talar man endast med kaniner in 2014

References

External links 

 

1958 births
Living people
Swedish women illustrators
Swedish children's book illustrators
Swedish women children's writers
Writers from Stockholm
August Prize winners
20th-century Swedish women writers
21st-century Swedish women writers